Black Market is an instrumental jazz fusion album released by Weather Report in 1976. This album was produced by Joe Zawinul and Wayne Shorter. It was recorded between December 1975 and January 1976 and released in March 1976 through Columbia Records. Columbia released it again as a digitally remastered CD in 1991.

This is Weather Report's sixth overall album and the first to feature bass player Jaco Pastorius, who appears on two tracks, one of which was his own composition "Barbary Coast." The back cover photo shows Pastorius, Chester Thompson, and Alex Acuña with the band, although bass player Alphonso Johnson played on the majority of the record's tracks. The album draws heavily from African influences and its style could be described as "world fusion". The second track, "Cannon Ball", is a tribute to saxophonist Julian "Cannonball" Adderley, Zawinul's employer for several years during the 1960s. Adderley died a few months before Black Market was recorded.

Track listing

Personnel 

Musicians:

 Joe Zawinul — Yamaha Grand Piano, Rhodes Electric Piano, 2 × ARP 2600, Oberheim Polyphonic Synthesizer, orchestration
 Wayne Shorter — Selmer soprano and tenor saxophones, Computone Lyricon
 Alphonso Johnson — electric bass
 Jaco Pastorius — electric fretless bass (tracks 2 & 6)
 Narada Michael Walden — drums (tracks 1 and 2)
 Chester Thompson — drums (track 1, tracks 3–7)
 Alex Acuña — congas, percussion (tracks 2–5, track 7)
 Don Alias — percussion (tracks 1 and 6)

Production:

 Joe Zawinul — producer
 Wayne Shorter — co-producer
 Ron Malo — engineer
 Nancy Donald — cover design
 David McMacken — cover illustration 
 Ed Caraeff — photography

References

External links

Weather Report Annotated Discography: Black Market

1976 albums
Columbia Records albums
Black Market